Čiulai is a small village, located about  east of Mindūnai along the Highway 114 in the municipality of Molėtai, Lithuania. As of 2011, it had a population of 38 people. Two small lakes lie to the southeast of the village, Tramys I and II and the larger Baltieji Lakajai.

History
The village was first mentioned in baptismal records of Molėtai in 1688. In 1941, the Čiulai estate was devastated by the Red Army according to the Lithuanian Archives.

Notable people
Povilas Budrys (born 1962) stage actor

References

Villages in Utena County
Molėtai District Municipality